is a Japanese actress and comedian from Itoigawa, Niigata.

She is represented with Yoshimoto Creative Agency in Tokyo from Yoshimoto Kogyo. She graduated from NSC in Tokyo. She is equally synchronised with comedy duos Matenrō and Dennis.

Filmography

Current appearances

Former regular appearances

Other former appearances
Neta series

Variety series

TV drama

Films

Radio

Advertisements

References

External links
  
 Official agency profile 

1990 births
Living people
Actors from Niigata Prefecture
21st-century Japanese actresses
Japanese impressionists (entertainers)